Eunidia thomseni is a species of beetle in the family Cerambycidae. It was described by William Lucas Distant in 1898. It is known from Tanzania, Cameroon, Chad, Niger, Ethiopia, Senegal, Mozambique, Botswana, Namibia, Saudi Arabia, the Central African Republic, Somalia, Uganda, South Africa, Yemen, Kenya, and Zimbabwe.

Variety
 Eunidia thomseni var. albietosa Breuning, 1957
 Eunidia thomseni var. ferrandii Aurivillius, 1926
 Eunidia thomseni var. guttata Breuning, 1957

References

Eunidiini
Beetles described in 1898